The 1912–13 season was the 18th season of competitive football in Belgium.

Overview
Union Saint-Gilloise won the first ever "double" in Belgian football history by winning the Division I (in a test match against holder Daring Club de Bruxelles) as well as the second edition of the Belgian Cup.

National team

* Belgium score given first

Key
 H = Home match
 A = Away match
 N = On neutral ground
 F = Friendly
 o.g. = own goal

Honours

Final league tables

Division I

Promotion

References
RSSSF archive – Final tables 1895–2002
Belgian clubs history 
Belgium Soccer History